Ruby Wright (October 27, 1939 – September 27, 2009) was an American country music singer-songwriter. Wright was the daughter of country singers Kitty Wells and Johnnie Wright. She sang with her parents as a young girl and at age 13, was signed by RCA Records as Ruby Wells because there was also a Ruby Wright who was a pop singer.

In the mid-1950s, she became part of an all-girl trio, 'Nita, Rita and Ruby. The Nita of the trio was Anita Carter of the well-known Carter Family. Working with Chet Atkins, the young singers enjoyed some success on record. Strictly a recording group, they did not make personal appearances or tours; Rita had a problem with stage fright which eventually meant the break-up of the trio. After the trio disbanded, Ruby began singing with her sister, Carol Sue, as The Wright Sisters.  They were signed to a recording contract by Cadence Records also under the direction of Chet Atkins. Ruby also made some recordings as Ruby Wells with her father and uncle as Johnnie and Jack and Ruby. Her most successful single was "Dern Ya", an answer to Roger Miller's "Dang Me".
She signed with Epic Records in 1966. Wright recorded for Plantation Records and Scorpion Records, as well as other small labels during the 1970s.

Wright died of heart-related illness on September 27, 2009, a month before her 70th birthday. She was survived by her parents, Johnnie Wright and Kitty Wells; son, Larry Stephenson; daughters, Kitty Ervin and Corrie (Brad) Cluck; brother, Bobby Wright; sister, Carol Sue Sturdivant; 3 grandchildren, Kourtney Wingert, Kaitlin Ervin and Brandon Ervin; great-grandchildren, Max Wingert and Aaron Key. Her father, Johnnie, died on September 27, 2011, exactly two years after Ruby's death.

Discography

Albums

Singles

References

External links
[ Ruby Wright] at Allmusic

1939 births
2009 deaths
American women country singers
American country singer-songwriters
Musicians from Nashville, Tennessee
20th-century American singers
Singer-songwriters from Tennessee
20th-century American women singers
Country musicians from Tennessee
21st-century American women